Cho Myoung-gyon (born 17 November 1957) is a South Korean politician previously served as President Moon Jae-in's first Minister of Unification.

After passing the state exam in 1979, Cho spent most of his career at the Ministry of Unification. He actively participated in multiple projects and negotiations with Pyongyang which resulted in enhanced Inter-Korean relations during Kim Dae-jung and Roh Moo-hyun administrations commended by then-Minister Jeong Se-hyun. He left public service upon the beginning of the new administration in 2008. Since then he completely distanced himself from politics before being appointed as Minister in 2017. 

During his term as Minister, Inter-Korean relations dramatically improved which was deteriorated after Kim and Roh administrations. 

He holds two degrees - a bachelor's in statistics from Sungkyunkwan University and a master's in administration from Seoul National University.

References 

Living people
Sungkyunkwan University alumni
Seoul National University alumni
1957 births
People from Uijeongbu
Government ministers of South Korea
Experts on North Korea